Gum Springs is a town in Clark County, Arkansas, United States. The population was 120 at the 2010 census, down from 194 in 2000.

Geography
Gum Springs is located northeast of the center of Clark County at  (34.062631, -93.099495). U.S. Route 67 passes through the town, leading northeast  to Arkadelphia, the county seat, and southwest  to Gurdon. Interstate 30 passes northwest of the town, with access from Exit 69.

Demographics

As of the census of 2000, there were 194 people, 87 households, and 54 families residing in the town.  The population density was 187.3/km2 (483.8/mi2).  There were 100 housing units at an average density of 96.5/km2 (249.4/mi2).  The racial makeup of the town was 44.85% White and 55.15% Black or African American.  4.64% of the population were Hispanic or Latino of any race.

There were 87 households, out of which 21.8% had children under the age of 18 living with them, 44.8% were married couples living together, 16.1% had a female householder with no husband present, and 36.8% were non-families. 29.9% of all households were made up of individuals, and 12.6% had someone living alone who was 65 years of age or older.  The average household size was 2.23 and the average family size was 2.69.

In the town, the population was spread out, with 19.1% under the age of 18, 9.3% from 18 to 24, 26.3% from 25 to 44, 27.3% from 45 to 64, and 18.0% who were 65 years of age or older.  The median age was 42 years. For every 100 females, there were 110.9 males.  For every 100 females age 18 and over, there were 101.3 males.

The median income for a household in the town was $31,000, and the median income for a family was $34,167. Males had a median income of $19,375 versus $16,875 for females. The per capita income for the town was $13,404.  About 14.3% of families and 17.3% of the population were below the poverty line, including 14.3% of those under the age of eighteen and 29.1% of those 65 or over.

Education
It is within the Arkadelphia School District, which operates Arkadelphia High School.

References

Towns in Clark County, Arkansas
Towns in Arkansas